A Is For Aardvark was a Canadian informational television series which aired on CBC Television in 1954.

Premise
Each episode concerned a particular letter of the alphabet and discussed various subjects beginning with that letter.

The first episode featured the letter "A" and included topics such as the African violet and aspidistra plants, the explorer Amerigo Vespucci, the astrolabe and guest Andrew Allan, a CBC producer.

Scheduling
The half-hour series was first telecast on Wednesdays at 10:00 pm (Eastern) from 7 July until 22 September 1954. From 30 September 1954, the show was shown Thursdays at 10:30 pm until its last episode on 21 October that year.

Only 14 episodes were broadcast, with the last episode (featuring the letter "N") hosted by James Bannerman instead of Sinclair. All 26 letters were completed in a subsequent radio series.

References

External links
 
 

CBC Television original programming
1954 Canadian television series debuts
1954 Canadian television series endings
Black-and-white Canadian television shows